Stan Humphreys (15 June 1904 – 1984) was a British gymnast. He competed at the 1924 Summer Olympics and the 1928 Summer Olympics.

References

External links
 

1904 births
1984 deaths
British male artistic gymnasts
Olympic gymnasts of Great Britain
Gymnasts at the 1924 Summer Olympics
Gymnasts at the 1928 Summer Olympics
Place of birth missing
20th-century British people